John G. "Jack" Hewson Sr. (September 7, 1924 – June 26, 2012) was an American professional basketball player.

Early life and education
Hewson was raised in Waldwick, New Jersey and attended Ramsey High School. As part of the V-12 Navy College Training Program during World War II, Hewson attended Muhlenberg College, Bucknell College and Temple University. He graduated from the Maurice H. Kornberg School of Dentistry in 1948.

Hewson began his college career playing for Doggie Julian at Muhlenberg in 1942, while also playing football for the Mules. The next season, under the Navy's wartime V-5 training program, Hewson trained and competed for Bucknell in both sports. After his training, he was sent to Temple to become a Navy dentist and suited up for his third school in the two sports.

Hewson played for the Philadelphia Sphas of the American Basketball League in the 1946–47 season before being selected in the 1947 BAA draft by the Boston Celtics. He played for the Celtics during the 1947–48 season, appearing in 24 games and averaging 2.7 points. Hewson spent the following three years of his career playing for the Trenton Tigers and Bridgeport Aer-A-Sols of the American Basketball League, and the Pottsville Packers and Berwick Carbuilders of the Continental Basketball Association.

From 1949 to 1952, Hewson served in the United States Army Medical Corps and deployed to Europe as part of the occupation after World War II. During this time, he coached and played basketball. He became a captain.

BAA career statistics

Regular season

References

External links

John G. "Jack" Hewson's obituary

1924 births
2012 deaths
20th-century dentists
21st-century American Jews
All-American college men's basketball players
American dentists
American expatriate basketball people 
American men's basketball players
Basketball players from New Jersey
Boston Celtics draft picks
Boston Celtics players
Bucknell Bison football players
Bucknell Bison men's basketball players
Centers (basketball)
Forwards (basketball)
Muhlenberg Mules football players
Muhlenberg Mules men's basketball players
People from Loudon County, Tennessee
People from Waldwick, New Jersey
Philadelphia Sphas players
Ramsey High School (New Jersey) alumni
Sportspeople from Bergen County, New Jersey
Temple Owls football players
Temple Owls men's basketball players
United States Army officers
United States Navy midshipmen